Ligoniel Football Club was an Irish football club based in the then village of Ligoniel on the outskirts of Belfast. It was founded in 1881 and was a founding member of the Irish Junior League in 1890, before joining the Irish Football League for the 1891-92 season. The club was excluded for the 1892-93 season as the League was reduced to six members, but was admitted again for the 1893-94 season. The club was excluded again in 1894 and rejoined the Junior League. It remained a member of the Junior League until it folded in 1899, having lost its ground and been unable to procure a new one.

References

Association football clubs established in 1881
Association football clubs disestablished in 1899
Defunct association football clubs in Northern Ireland
Defunct Irish Football League clubs
Association football clubs in Belfast
1881 establishments in Ireland
1899 disestablishments in Ireland
Former senior Irish Football League clubs